Stop! Or My Mom Will Shoot is a 1992 American buddy cop action black comedy film directed by Roger Spottiswoode and starring Sylvester Stallone and Estelle Getty. The film was released in the United States on February 21, 1992. The film received highly negative reviews upon release but grossed $70.6 million worldwide.

The film is generally considered a lesser film in Stallone’s catalog. In 2006, in response to a question about the films Stallone wished he had not done, this film was the first one he mentioned.

Plot
Sergeant Joseph Andrew Bomowski (Sylvester Stallone) is a tough cop. His seemingly frail mother Tutti (Estelle Getty) comes to stay with him and progressively interferes in his life, driving him crazy.

After cleaning his gun with bleach and finding out she ruined it, Tutti buys him an illegal MAC-10 machine pistol, and  witnesses the murder of one of the men who sold her the gun. Tutti is taken to the police station to give a statement, and starts poking around in Joe's cases. She learns the gun she purchased was part of a collection taken from a burned building, and the gun insurance money was received.

On her way back home, Tutti recognizes a man at the airport. He  flees when she and Joe follow him, and Tutti remembers she saw him on America's Most Wanted for shooting his mother.

Cast

 Sylvester Stallone as Sergeant Joseph Andrew "Joe" Bomowski
 Estelle Getty as Tutti Bomowski
 JoBeth Williams as Lieutenant Gwen Harper
 Al Fann as Sergeant Lou
 Roger Rees as J. Parnell
 Martin Ferrero as Paulie
 Gailard Sartain as Munroe
 John Wesley as Sergeant Tony
 J. Kenneth Campbell as Ross
 Ving Rhames as Mr. Stereo
 Richard Schiff as Gun Clerk
 Dennis Burkley as Mitchell

Production

Development and writing
Sylvester Stallone famously signed on to the film based solely on Arnold Schwarzenegger claiming that he was interested in the lead. In October 2017, Schwarzenegger confirmed the rumor that, knowing the script was "really bad", he had publicly faked interest in starring for producers to lure Stallone.

Reception

Box office
The film brought in $28.4 million in the US and over $42.2 million internationally for a total of $70.6 million worldwide.

Critical response
The film has a 14% approval rating on Rotten Tomatoes based on 29 reviews. The critical consensus reads: "Thoroughly witless and thuddingly unfunny, Stop! Or My Mom Will Shoot gives its mismatched stars very little to work with - and as a result, they really don't work." Audiences polled by CinemaScore gave the film an average grade of "B+" on an A+ to F scale.

Rita Kempley of The Washington Post called it "your worst nightmare" but stated that "the concept is actually better for Stallone than the premises of his earlier awful romps, Rhinestone and Oscar." Clifford Terry wrote in the Chicago Tribune that the film "plays like an extended sitcom-perhaps four episodes of She's the Sheriff" and also that "About two-thirds into Stop! Or My Mom Will Shoot, Sylvester Stallone actually delivers the title line. That's how numbingly awful this is. Give it half a star for being in focus."  Michael Wilmington of the Los Angeles Times wrote that the film seemed like Stallone's response to Schwarzenegger's turn to comedies like Kindergarten Cop and added, "This is another 'high-concept' marketing hook job—a slick, slow-witted, shiny, 100% predictable movie—and the scriptwriters ... don't have anything richer on their minds than the usual feisty mother-son gags."

Both Gene Siskel and Roger Ebert disliked the film and both gave it a thumbs down in their onscreen review of the film. Ebert said it was "one of the worst movies I've ever seen"; in his newspaper review (in which he awarded half of one star out of four), Ebert labeled it as "one of those movies so dimwitted, so utterly lacking in even the smallest morsel of redeeming value, that you stare at the screen in stunned disbelief. It is moronic beyond comprehension, an exercise in desperation during which even Sylvester Stallone, a repository of self-confidence, seems to be disheartened." Siskel gave the film zero stars out of four and stated that if the script had been submitted to the staff of The Golden Girls, which co-starred Getty, it "would be summarily dismissed as too flimsy for a half-hour sitcom. There is not one laugh nor surprising moment to be found, starting with the scene where Stallone and Getty happen upon a jumper atop a building and Getty manages to bring the man down safely using a bullhorn."

Sylvester Stallone has stated that Stop! Or My Mom Will Shoot was the worst film he had ever starred in. He told Ain't It Cool News that it was "maybe one of the worst films in the entire solar system, including alien productions we’ve never seen", that "a flatworm could write a better script", and "in some countries – China, I believe – running [the movie] once a week on government television has lowered the birth rate to zero. If they ran it twice a week, I believe in twenty years China would be extinct."

Later Stallone said: Stop! Or My Mom Will Shoot was supposed to be like Throw Momma From the Train with the mom as this really nasty piece of work. Instead you hire the nicest woman in Hollywood, Estelle Getty, who you wish was your mother. That’s the end of that! Also, I had heard Schwarzenegger was going to do that movie and I said, “I’m going to beat him to it.” I think he set me up.

Accolades
It was the recipient of three Golden Raspberry Awards: Stallone as Worst Actor, Getty as Worst Supporting Actress, and Worst Screenplay.

Other media

In popular culture
The film was mentioned when Stallone hosted an episode of Saturday Night Live in 1997; in one particular skit, Stallone comes across someone in a terrible car accident (Norm Macdonald) who does not like any of his work and ridicules his films. As he lies dying, he mutters something quietly that only Stallone can hear, and when a passerby (Will Ferrell) asks what he said, Stallone is reluctant to say it until he is grilled some more, at which point he virulently yells "He said Stop! Or My Mom Will Shoot...SUCKED!"

The title of The Simpsons episode "Stop! Or My Dog Will Shoot" is a reference to the film. That episode involves the Simpsons' dog joining the Springfield Police Force after saving Homer from a corn maze.

In Mortal Kombat 11, during a pre-match dialogue exchange between John Rambo (voiced by Stallone) and Cassie Cage, Cassie references the film's title.

References

External links

 
 
 
 
 

1992 films
1992 action comedy films
1990s buddy comedy films
American action comedy films
American buddy comedy films
American buddy cop films
American police detective films
1990s buddy cop films
Films set in Los Angeles
Films shot in California
1990s police comedy films
Universal Pictures films
Films directed by Roger Spottiswoode
Films produced by Ivan Reitman
Films produced by Michael C. Gross
Films scored by Alan Silvestri
Films with screenplays by William Davies
Films with screenplays by Blake Snyder
Golden Raspberry Award winning films
1990s English-language films
1990s American films